Gigi Fernández and Robin White were the defending champions but lost in the quarterfinals to Steffi Graf and Gabriela Sabatini.

Hana Mandlíková and Martina Navratilova won in the final 5–7, 6–4, 6–4 against Mary Joe Fernández and Pam Shriver. Navratilova became the 1st player to win 30 Grand Slam titles in Women's Doubles, a record for the most grand slam titles in any single category for any player, male or female.

Seeds 
Champion seeds are indicated in bold text while text in italics indicates the round in which those seeds were eliminated.

Draw

Finals

Top half

Section 1

Section 2

Bottom half

Section 3

Section 4

External links 
1989 US Open – Women's draws and results at the International Tennis Federation

Women's Doubles
US Open (tennis) by year – Women's doubles
1989 in women's tennis
1989 in American women's sports